Julien Leclercq (born 7 August 1979) is a French film director, screenwriter and producer.

Julien Leclercq began his career in 2004 with the production of the short film Transit, in which he explored a retro-future world populated by half-flesh, half-metal beings. The short film got the attention of the producer Franck Chorot and Gaumont, who promptly offered Leclercq a budget of 8.7 million euros to produce his first feature film Chrysalis, the story of a police lieutenant (played by Albert Dupontel) who tries to find his wife's killer in a Paris of 2025. Leclercq returned to reality to undertake the ambitious project of L'Assaut, a film about the hijack of the Paris-Algiers flight in December 1994.

His work includes directing the 2013 film The Informant, producing the 2014 film L'Affaire SK1, and writing and directing the 2015 film Braqueurs.

Filmography

External links
 

Living people
French film directors
French male screenwriters
French screenwriters
People from Somain, Nord
1979 births
French film producers